Diamonds & Rust in the Bullring is a Joan Baez album, recorded live in the bullring of Bilbao, Spain. It featured twelve songs, six of which were performed in English, five in Spanish and one - "Txoria Txori" - in Basque. Most of the songs had been performed and recorded by Baez previously, with the exception of Leonard Cohen's "Famous Blue Raincoat", Sting's " Ellas Dancen Solas" and the aforementioned Basque number.

"Gracias a la Vida" is a duet with singer Mercedes Sosa.

Track listing
"Diamonds & Rust" (Joan Baez) – 3:45
"Ain't Gonna Let Nobody Turn Me Around" (Traditional) – 1:22
"No Woman, No Cry" (Bob Marley) – 3:45
"Famous Blue Raincoat" (Leonard Cohen) – 4:58 
"Swing Low, Sweet Chariot" (Traditional) – 3:41
"Let It Be" (John Lennon/Paul McCartney) – 3:59
"El Preso Numero Nueve" (Hermanos Cantoral) – 3:14
"Llegó Con Tres Heridas" (Miguel Hernández) – 2:38 
"Txoria Txori" (J. A. Arze/M. Laboa) – 2:54
"Ellas Danzan Solas" (Cueca Sola) (R.Livi/Sting) – 5:35
"Gracias a la Vida" (Violeta Parra) – 6:05
"No Nos Moverán" (Traditional) – 1:22

Personnel
Alan V. Abrahams – producer, mixing
John Acosta – cello
Begnat Amorena – drums
Laythan Armor – synthesizer, keyboards
Joan Baez – arranger, liner notes, artwork, illustrations
Marlene Bergman – design, cover design
Cesar Cancino – piano, arranger, cello arrangement
Jean Marie Ecay – guitar
Jose Agustin Guereu – bass
Charles Paakkari – mixing
Costel Restea – cello
Mercedes Sosa – vocals
L. A. Mass Choir - vocals on "Let It Be"
Donald Taylor – director, choir director, choir master
Wally Traugott – mastering

Bilbao
Joan Baez live albums
1988 live albums